Ferdinand Bruhin (19 July 1908 – 7 May 1986) was a Swiss footballer who spent most of his career with Olympique de Marseille

References

  Profile

1908 births
1986 deaths
Association football midfielders
Swiss men's footballers
U.S. Cremonese players
Olympique de Marseille players
Olympique Lyonnais players
Expatriate footballers in France
Ligue 1 players